Mackenzie Skapski (born June 15, 1994) is a goaltending coach and former Canadian professional ice hockey goaltender who last played for HKM Zvolen in the Tipsport Liga (Slovak). He has formerly played for the New York Rangers in the National Hockey League (NHL).

Playing career
Skapski was born in Abbotsford, British Columbia. While playing Major Midget for the Fraser Valley Bruins as a 15-year-old, Skapski suffered serious injuries which threatened his career when the team bus crashed on December 11, 2009. He suffered a broken nose and orbital bone and required surgery to relieve a blood clot near his brain. Although able to play again in less than a year, the injuries delayed his career progression.

Skapski played junior hockey for the Kootenay Ice of the Western Hockey League (WHL).  He was drafted by the New York Rangers in the sixth round of the 2013 NHL Entry Draft.  He had been rated as the 17th best draft-eligible goalie in North America by Central Scouting. He previously played minor ice hockey in his hometown of Abbotsford, British Columbia.

Skapski began the 2014-15 season with the Greenville Road Warriors of the ECHL but was called up to the Hartford Wolf Pack of the American Hockey League (AHL) after playing just one game to replace Jason Missiaen, who was demoted to Greenville.  He made his AHL debut on October 24 and recorded his first shutout on October 26.  He played well enough at Hartford to remain with the team until his promotion to the Rangers, with a 2.38 goals against average and a .914 save percentage in 24 games. Ranger staff felt he was making "good progression" at Hartford prior to his promotion. According to sportswriter Paul Doyle, Skapski's "even demeanor" was key to his successful transition to the AHL.

He was called up from Hartford on February 4, 2015, when the Rangers' starting goaltender Henrik Lundqvist went down with a ruptured blood vessel in his neck.  His first appearance with the Rangers was as the backup to Cam Talbot in a game against the Boston Bruins. He made his NHL debut on February 20, 2015 against the Buffalo Sabres, in which he made 24 saves en route to a 3-1 win. Skapski earned his first NHL shutout in his second NHL game, also against the Sabres, in a game on March 14, 2015. When Lundqvist returned from his injury, Skapski was returned to the Wolf Pack on March 25, 2015.

At the conclusion of his entry-level contract, Skapski became a free agent after he was not tendered a qualifying offer by the Rangers. On September 25, 2017, he agreed to an AHL invite to attend the Toronto Marlies 2017 training camp. On November 3, 2017, he was belatedly signed to a one-year AHL contract with the Marlies for the 2017–18 season. He was immediately re-assigned to ECHL affiliate, the Orlando Solar Bears.

As a free agent in the following off-season, Skapski opted to embark on a European career, agreeing to a one-year deal with Slovakian club, HKM Zvolen of the Tipsport Liga, on July 18, 2018.

On December 18, 2020, Skapski was announced as the new goaltending coach for the Chilliwack Chiefs of the British Columbia Hockey League.

International play
He represented Canada Pacific in the 2011 World U-17 Hockey Challenge, winning a bronze medal.

Career statistics

Regular season and playoffs

International

References

External links

1994 births
Living people
Canadian ice hockey goaltenders
Greenville Road Warriors players
Greenville Swamp Rabbits players
Hartford Wolf Pack players
Ice hockey people from British Columbia
Kootenay Ice players
New York Rangers draft picks
New York Rangers players
Orlando Solar Bears (ECHL) players
Sportspeople from Abbotsford, British Columbia
HKM Zvolen players
Canadian expatriate ice hockey players in the United States
Canadian expatriate ice hockey players in Slovakia